Tyler Portis Hicks (born July 9, 1969) is a photojournalist who works as a staff photographer for The New York Times. Based in Kenya, he covers foreign news for the newspaper with an emphasis on conflict and war.

Hicks was present during the deadly attack by terrorists on the Westgate shopping center in Nairobi on September 21, 2013. As injured victims tried to escape, Hicks entered the mall and followed Kenyan army and police as they searched for Al-Shabaab militants. For this work he was awarded the 2014 Pulitzer Prize for breaking news photography as well as the Robert Capa Gold Medal, awarded by the Overseas Press Club of America. In 2016, he received another Pulitzer Prize for his coverage of the European migrant crisis, sharing it with Mauricio Lima, Sergey Ponomarev, and Daniel Etter "for photographs that captured the resolve of refugees, the perils of their journeys and the struggle of host countries to take them in."

Hicks was named the newspaper photographer of the year by the Missouri School of Journalism's Pictures of the Year International in 2007. In 2010, his photographs from the wars in Iraq and Afghanistan, along with the war correspondence of his colleagues Dexter Filkins and C.J. Chivers, with whom he often worked, were selected by New York University as being among the Top Ten Works of Journalism of the Decade.  Hicks received a George Polk Award for Foreign Reporting in 2011.

Hicks was previously a freelance photographer based in Africa and the Balkans, and worked for newspapers in North Carolina and Ohio. He has worked in Syria, Libya, Afghanistan, Pakistan, India, Iraq, Russia, Bosnia, Lebanon, Israel, Gaza, Chechnya and many countries in Africa, including South Sudan during the 2011 referendum. He graduated from Staples High School in 1988, and went on to Boston University's College of Communication, where he earned a degree in Journalism in 1992. He returned to Boston University in 2011 to deliver the commencement address at the College of Communication.

Hicks was reported missing on March 16, 2011, while covering the revolution in Libya for The New York Times. The New York Times reported on March 18, 2011 that Libya had agreed to free Hicks, Anthony Shadid, Lynsey Addario and Stephen Farrell. Hicks and his three colleagues were released on March 21, 2011, six days after being captured by pro-Qaddafi forces.

On February 16, 2012, Anthony Shadid suffered a fatal asthma attack while covering civil unrest in Syria with Hicks. Hicks assisted in carrying Shadid's body across the border into Turkey.

Hicks was married in Kingsport, Nova Scotia on August 26, 2017 to documentary filmmaker Claire Ward.

References

External links
Hicks's essays on the Times' Lens blog

American photojournalists
War photographers
Boston University College of Communication alumni
The New York Times visual journalists
Living people
1969 births
George Polk Award recipients
Staples High School alumni